«MEGA» is a Belarusian musical and entertaining Internet radio station focusing mainly on club music – as trance, techno, house, electro, dubstep and musical directions adjacent by it.

The basis of broadcast forming by the most popular hits and new songs. A ratio of domestic songs to import are 50/50. Key feature of radio station is advance of young DJs and not skilled radio jockeys, it is a basis of strategy of «MEGA» Internet radio station.

History 
The radio station began test broadcasts on January 28, 2012, The radio station was broadcast with faults, with often delays broadcasting of shows. During the test broadcasts is often played different music (mostly trance), with often repetitions.

The full broadcast of Internet radio station «MEGA» began February 13, 2012. Since then, the radio station has increased the number of shows and the number of RJs and DJs. The radio starts first real time shows. As soon began full broadcasting station stops the shows  from February 14, and disappear from the studio all the DJs and RJs. The radio starts to spin the music non-stop. Following this incident, the majority of employees leave the radio by their own. A week later, broadcast was restored. From this moment on the radio station canceled real time broadcasting.

In the month of March began an active influx of DJs, radio station start shows such as: «Dutch House», «Electric Shock", and «Trance Formation». The radio station starts show "Others" - a show  that introduces the audience radio club «MEGA» for other styles of music (jazz, reggae, rap, rock, metal, chanson, etc.) as well as with groups that are in these styles of play . Here you can hear all the unknown for clubman styles and groups, from jazz to metal to hear their story of origin and the differences from each other, and meet interesting people from the areas of theater and cinema, show business, etc. This program helps beginners  and  bands to get up . Among them are mostly of Gomel metal scene: CANADA, ATOM's, as well as groups from Ukraine and Russia: TGDM, Cry of the Soul, Robin Good, Consul and others.

At April 16  started the official website of radio station «MEGA».

In July, the format of radio station starts sliding towards pop music, but management of radio station denies that fact.

On August 1, 2012 planning to open a radio channel broadcasting to residents of Siberia and the Far East - «MEGA» (+3), «MEGA» (+7).

Broadcast 
Radio is available 24/7.

Broadcast consists of a mix of DJs and speaking shows. The radio doesn't have a real time shows, all of the shows  are recorded before.

In the radio station «MEGA», there are many authors of the shows. They correspond to the tastes of different audiences. Lovers of cinema invites Show «Kinovarka». All the passions of youth can be learned from the show «Contacts». A conversation with interesting people from the world of show business in the «Interview On-Petersburg». Exposure «MEGA» well as music shows, such as «2 in 1», «ZvezdoChas», «ClubOutside», «Trance Formation», etc.

As for the music filling the radio broadcast of «MEGA», is a prerequisite - electronic and dance music (CHR/Dance). To meet the demand of listeners, the station collaborates with artists and producers. The work of DJ-s - an indicator of the radio. More broadcasting time given to the DJ's mixes. The radio can be heard of DJs from the CIS countries and abroad.

Distribution 
Internet space.

The area, which is broadcasting and retransmission, almost completely covers the providers of Belarus, as well as a number of Russian and Ukrainian ISPs. Listening is completely free. In addition, some programs are broadcast on radio in other countries that substantially increases the target audience of the project.

Programmes 
 Non-stop Music - music non-stop.
 MEGA Hits - Block of music hits 70-80-90-00h period.
 In an interview from St. Petersburg  - Lera Piterskaya authoring show.
 2 in 1  - A show  with two tracks that are very similar to each other. Someone says it's plagiarism, and some say that this is a cover version. You will hear two tracks and compare how they look and find out who performs them, and learn to translate the tracks of a foreign language to Russian.
 The Coordinates - a special project of the online magazine "The New Wave Media."
 ClubOutside  - a radio show that conveys the beauty of the mixes and compilations, in which the author can express his thoughts or just make a collection. This is an opportunity to get acquainted with the best new electronic music and enjoy the unique atmosphere of trance music. Forget for an hour and enjoy the world of emotions and associations received from the music.
 Kinovarka - a show about the film.
 ZvezdoChas - that show  introduces you to a musician. You'll learn about it all the biography, as well as hear his music.
 Trance Formation - a show of music, trance.
 Ego Chart
 Clubs Of The World

Closed Programmes 
 Others
 ElectroShock
 Dutch House
 Euphoria Of Sound
 Let's change things?!
 Russian Dance
 Dubstep mealtime
 World DJs
 MEGA Old
 MEGA Russian
 MEGA Trance
 MEGA House
 MEGA Dance
 MEGA Techno
 MEGA Electro

Presenters 
 RJ Valeria
 Valeria Piterskaya
 RJ Mashell
 Natalia Kuznetsova
 Tatiana Taganova
 DJ Alex Van Seven
 DJ Kostya Sergeev
 Sveta Sova
 Alan Sierra
 DJ Dima Still
 Beatkoff
 DJ Patap
 DJ Paky
 ISj
 Steve Naked
 DJ Mirchik
 DJ Yanni
 DJ Kan
 DJ Vinich

EX Presenters 
 RJ Vadim
 Serzh
 DJ Paul Scriptum
 DJ Alexsei Shumakov
 DJ IT
 Dmitriy NRj
 DJ Vamp1r
 Fred
 Tanya Baltunova
 Exor
 DJ Fayross
 Alex CJ Wise
 Tugvo
 DJ Deni$off
 Yumbrique (DJ Able)
 DJ KoToFF
 DJ Paradizze
 DJ Yura Bogdanchikov
 DJ Sergey Pyatnizkiy
 DJ Brick (moved to MFM Ukraine)
 DJ DJorg
 DJ Black Xandra
 DJ Prado

References

Internet radio stations
Radio stations in Belarus
Radio stations established in 2012